Viljar Schiff (born in 1974) is an Estonian military personnel.

He has been the chief inspector of Estonian Defence Forces.

2001-2006, he was Commandant of the Estonian National Defence College. 

In 1997, he was awarded with Order of the Cross of the Eagle, iron cross.

References

Living people
1974 births
Estonian military personnel